Viki Saha (born 31 December 1997) is an Indian first-class cricketer who plays for Tripura. He made his List A debut on 27 February 2014, for Tripura in the 2013–14 Vijay Hazare Trophy. He made his Twenty20 debut on 9 January 2016 in the 2015–16 Syed Mushtaq Ali Trophy.

References

External links
 

1997 births
Living people
Indian cricketers
Tripura cricketers
Place of birth missing (living people)